Ivan Vasilyevich Maslov (1 August 1920 — 30 March 2011) was a Soviet flying ace during World War II. Awarded the title Hero of the Soviet Union on 1 July 1944 for his initial victories, by the end of the war he tallied 23 solo and 15 shared shootdowns.

References 

1920 births
2011 deaths
Soviet World War II flying aces
Heroes of the Soviet Union
Recipients of the Order of Lenin
Recipients of the Order of the Red Banner
Recipients of the Order of Alexander Nevsky
Recipients of the Order of the Red Star